Colio Estate Wines is a  vineyard and winery in Harrow, Ontario, Canada that opened in 1980.

Its brands include CEV Signature Series-Limited Edition Wines, Colio Estate Vineyards Ultra Premium, Colio Estate VQA Varietals and Premium, Colio Varietals and Blends and Girls' Night Out. They produce icewines, sparkling wines and St. Tropez Non-Alcoholic Cocktail.

Carlo Negri, master wine maker 
Immigrating from Italy in 1980, Carlo Negri was Colio Estate Wines' first wine maker. His 30 year long career is credited with the flourishing wine/tourism of the Lake Erie North-Shore area. Carlo won the "Tony Aspler Cuvée Award of Excellence" in 2005, an honor awarded to those who have "done most to further the aims and aspirations of the Ontario Wine Industry". Carlo and the winery won two Gold Medals in 2002, for the CEV Merlot Reserve in the Red Wine Category, and for CEV Carlo Negri Signature Meritage in the Limited Edition Red Wine category. They also won "Best in Category" honors the same year. After his passing in July 2014, Colio Estate Wines set up a $10,000 scholarship. Partnering with both St. Clair College and Brock University, the scholarship offers $5,000 to students studying culinary arts and hospitality and another $5,000 to students studying wine making.

In 2003, the winery brought winemaker Tim Reilly on board and moved their vineyard manager, Kevin Donohue, to the winemaking team.  Tim took the head winemaking reins in August 2007 – 2012. The winery has since acquired  in the Niagara-on-the-Lake region.

Girls' Night Out 
The Girls' Night Out product line includes nine wine beverages, specializing in chardonnay, sparkling wines, rosés and sangria. Their label design, three cocktail dresses, won a Silver Medal for label design at the Ontario Wine Awards in 2009.  Their products have featured in magazines such as Food and Wine, Elle and Hello! Canada.

Awards 
 Chardonnay – Silver Medal at the All-Canadian Wine Championships (2009)
 Rosé – Silver Medal at the Wine and Food Show (2009)

Thornbury Beverage Co. 
Thornbury Beverage Company is a cidery and brewery located in the Georgian Bay region. Established in 2006, the cidery operates on 7, 500 acres of apple orchards. They produce Ontario craft ciders and beers. The company was bought by Colio Estate Winery in early 2016.

Awards 
Thornbury Village Cidery has won 7 awards:
 2016 Gold Medal best 'Common Cider', OFVC Cider competition, Thornbury Cider
 2016 Silver Medal "Specialty Cider", OFVC Cider Competition, Thornbury Apple Cranberry Cider
 2015 Gold Medal, Canadian Brewing Awards, Thornbury Cranberry Cider and Pickup Truck Pilsner
 2015 Bronze Medal, Canadian Brewing Awards, Thornbury Premium Apple Cider
 2013 Gold Medal, Great Lakes International Cider and Perry Competition
 2012 Silver Medal, World Beer Championships Award
 2011 World Beer Championships Award

See also
Blind tasting of wine

References

External links
Colio Estate Wines

Wineries of Ontario
Essex County, Ontario